Bana may refer to:

Languages
 Bana language of northern Cameroon
 Pa Na language of China
 Phanaʼ language of Laos

People
 The Bana people of West Africa
 Bana (singer), balladeer from Cape Verde
 Banasura, an asura in Hindu mythology
 Bāṇabhaṭṭa, 7th-century Indian writer
 Bana, Burkina Faso, one of the 10 communes of the Balé Province of Burkina Faso
 Eric Bana (born 1968), Australian actor and comedian
 Bana, slayer of St. Juthwara
 Framji Cowasji Banaji (1767–1851), Indian developer of Bombay
 Mahzarin Banaji (born 1956), Indian-American psychologist

Places
 Bana, Guinea
 Bana, Rajasthan, in India
 Bana, Hungary, a village
 Bana, Cameroon, a village 
 Bana, Niger, a commune and village
 Bana Cathedral, a ruined medieval Christian cathedral in northeastern Turkey   
 Bana Kingdom, an ancient dynasty of South India
 Bana Rural LLG, an administrative division of Papua New Guinea

Other
 Basic analog loop, a type of leased telecommunications line
 Bana (fly), a genus of robber flies in the family Asilidae
 Bana, a 2019 album by Danheim

See also
 Banna people, an ethnic group in Ethiopia
 Banana (disambiguation)